Långön is an island in the northwest of the Swedish sector of the Bay of Bothnia, in the Luleå archipelago.

Description

It lies to the north of Stor-Brändön and west of Mjoön. 
It has a fine sandy beach on the north shore, but the beach is exposed to the weather. 
The island is mostly tree-covered, with some scattered bogs of different sizes and one shallow lake.
As of 2008 there were five permanent residents on the island. There were 18 houses, mostly summer cabins.

Access

Boats can land on the beach. There a private harbor that can be used by visitors to the residents of the island.
It runs from Hindersöstallarna on the mainland to the islands of Hindersön, Stor-Brändön and Långön.
Normally the road is open from January to April. Vehicle weight restrictions apply.
Ploughing of the section leading into Långön is funded privately.
In the winter there is a groomed and marked snowmobile trail between Långön and Småskär to the east.

References

Sources

Swedish islands in the Baltic
Islands of Norrbotten County